Argyractis berthalis is a moth in the family Crambidae. It is found in Brazil (Parana, São Paulo).

The forewings are pale yellowish up to the subterminal line. The terminal area is yellowish brown with a terminal row of black dots. The hindwings are whitish.

References

Acentropinae
Moths of South America
Moths described in 1906